Stadionul Orăşenesc is a multi-use stadium in Buftea, Romania. It is currently used mostly for football matches and is the home ground of Voința Buftea. The stadium holds 1,500 people.

External links 
 Stadionul Orăşenesc at Soccerway.com

Football venues in Romania